Coursetia hypoleuca is a species of legume in the family Fabaceae. It is found in Argentina and Bolivia. It is threatened by habitat loss.

Sources

Robinieae
Flora of Argentina
Flora of Bolivia
Vulnerable plants
Taxonomy articles created by Polbot
Taxobox binomials not recognized by IUCN